MyCoRe (portmanteau of My Content Repository) is an open source repository software framework for building disciplinary or institutional repositories, digital archives, digital libraries, and scientific journals. The software is developed at various German university libraries and computer centers. Although most MyCoRe web applications are located in Germany, there are English-language applications, such as "The International Treasury of Islamic Manuscripts" at the University of Cambridge (UK).

History
The first public version of MyCoRe was released in October 2001. Since then the software was developed by the MyCoRe team. The software became known as "Institutional Repository Software" as declared on the site of the Budapest Open Access Initiative. In Germany there are more than 20 Universities and institutions that provide over 70 repositories based on MyCoRe.

Technology
The MyCoRe framework was written in Java and XML. It is available as free software under GNU General Public License (GPL).

Features
Some important features of MyCoRe are as follows.

 Free and open-source software
 Customizable user interface
 Configurable metadata model: The Metadata Object Description Schema is the default metadata format within the MyCoRe sample application "MIR". Any other metadata format can be configured.
 Classifications can be edited or imported, as standard (e.g. DDC), in flat or hierarchical structure.
 Roles and rights are configurable
 There is an internal file system integrated in the MyCoRe framework.
 MyCoRe uses Checksum to ensure data integrity.
 All types of digital content, file formats and mime types can be assembled, managed, preserved and presented.
 An image viewer is integrated for presenting high-resolution digitized images in Web browser.
 MyCoRe supports common interoperability standards and interfaces such as the OAI-PMH 2.0 protocol or SWORD.
 MyCoRe provides an integrated Web content management system (WCMS) for editing static website content.
 Local or external authentication mechanisms can be used.
 A detailed rights and role concept allows to manage the access to data and metadata.
 MyCoRe provides a ready to install sample repository called MIR, which a system administrator can install on a single Linux, Mac OSX or Windows box to get started.

Operating Systems
MyCoRe software runs on Linux, Solaris, Unix, or Windows.

See also
 Digital library
 DSpace Repository Software
 Institutional repository
 Fedora Repository Software
 Opus Software
 SWORD

References

External links
 
 MyCoRe sample application: 
 
 

2001 software
Digital library software
Institutional repository software
Free institutional repository software
Free library and information science software
Free software programmed in Java (programming language)
Open-access archives